Pandemis fulvastra is a species of moth of the  family Tortricidae. It is found in China (Shanxi).

References

	

Moths described in 1994
Pandemis